Downingsville is an unincorporated community in Grant County, Kentucky, in the United States.

History
A post office called Downingsville was established in 1844, and remained in operation until it was discontinued in 1909. In the 1870s, business enterprises in Downingsville included a hotel, a gristmill and a sawmill.

References

Unincorporated communities in Grant County, Kentucky
Unincorporated communities in Kentucky